Joan Serra Llobet (8 July 1927 – 24 January 2015) was a Spanish water polo player who competed in the 1948 Summer Olympics. He was born in Sabadell, Catalonia.

He was part of the Spanish team which finished eighth in the 1948 tournament. He played all seven matches as goalkeeper. In 1951 won the gold medal in the Mediterranean Games. He died in Sabadell on 24 January 2015, aged 87.

See also
 Spain men's Olympic water polo team records and statistics
 List of men's Olympic water polo tournament goalkeepers

References

External links
 
 File at CN Sabadell website 

1927 births
2015 deaths
Water polo players from Catalonia
Spanish male water polo players
Water polo goalkeepers
Water polo players at the 1948 Summer Olympics
Olympic water polo players of Spain
Sportspeople from Sabadell
Competitors at the 1951 Mediterranean Games
Mediterranean Games gold medalists for Spain
Mediterranean Games medalists in water polo